Pigeon Creek is a stream in Ripley County in the U.S. state of Missouri. It is a tributary of South Fork Buffalo Creek.

Pigeon Creek, historically called "Pigeon Branch", was so named on account of the abundance of wild pigeons in the area.

See also
List of rivers of Missouri

References

Rivers of Ripley County, Missouri
Rivers of Missouri